Corallimorphidae is a family of corallimorphs. It includes three genera:

Corallimorphus Moseley, 1877 - 6 species
Corynactis Allman, 1846 - 14 species
Paracorynactis Ocaña, den Hartog, Brito, & Bos, 2010 - 1 species

References

 
Corallimorpharia
Cnidarian families